The Vineyard Playhouse is a professional, non-profit working theater company on the island of Martha's Vineyard. Housed in a historic building in downtown Vineyard Haven, MA, the theater produces shows year-round. It also hosts programs for children, and was described in the Vineyard Gazette as "the longest running professional theatre on the Island."

History
The Playhouse was established in 1982 by Eileen Wilson and Isabella Blake, according to the Playhouse's website, and the theatre company celebrated its 25th anniversary in 2007.

Repertoire
The repertoire ranges from summer shows featuring Broadway-quality actors as well as talented locals, to less posh but also impressive off-season shows, usually featuring local professional actors and members of the community. Traditionally the Christmas production is a family-oriented show that includes a large number of children. Most shows during the summer season are intended for adult audiences, but other shows are family-appropriate, and include roles for all ages. Some previous shows include The Snow Queen, The Homecoming, The Rimers of Eldridge, Romeo and Juliet, and Proof.

Relationship With and Contributions to the Vineyard Community
MJ Bruder Munafo, the Playhouse's Artistic Director, has a reputation for supporting local artists and writers. The Playhouse often hosts readings of new works in progress, or stages pieces that show artistic merit.

References

Theatre companies in Massachusetts